Naomi Altman is a statistician known for her work on kernel smoothing and kernel regression,
and interested in applications of statistics to gene expression and genomics. She is a professor of statistics at Pennsylvania State University, and a regular columnist for the "Points of Significance" column in Nature Methods.

Education and career
Altman studied mathematics at the University of Toronto, graduating in 1974, 
and spent two years teaching at Government Teacher's Training College in Lafia, Nigeria. Returning to Canada, she earned a master's degree in statistics from Toronto in 1979.

After working as a statistical consultant at Simon Fraser University and the University of British Columbia. She completed her doctorate in 1988 from Stanford University. Her dissertation, supervised by Iain M. Johnstone, was Smoothing Data with Correlated Errors.

She joined the Cornell University faculty, in the Biometrics Unit, and became chair of the Department of Biometrics there from 1997 to 2000. She moved to Penn State in 2001.

Recognition
Altman and her coauthor Julio C. Villarreal won the 2005 Canadian Journal of Statistics Award for their paper "Self-modelling regression for longitudinal data with time-invariant covariates".
In 2009, Altman became a Fellow of the American Statistical Association.

Selected publications

References

External links
Home page

Year of birth missing (living people)
Living people
American women statisticians
Canadian statisticians
University of Toronto alumni
Stanford University alumni
Pennsylvania State University faculty
Fellows of the American Statistical Association
Cornell University faculty
21st-century American women